Indrayani Mahavidyalaya, is an undergraduate and postgraduate, coeducational college situated in Talegaon, Pune district, Maharashtra. It was established in the year 1968. The college is affiliated with Pune University. This college offers different courses in arts and commerce.

Accreditation
The college is  recognized by the University Grants Commission (UGC).

References

External links
http://www.indrayanimahavidyalaya.com/index.html

Universities and colleges in Pune
Educational institutions established in 1968
1968 establishments in Maharashtra